Kearney  is a city in Clay County, Missouri, United States. The population per the 2020 U.S. Census was 10,404. The city was the birthplace of Jesse James, and there is an annual festival in the third weekend of September to recognize the outlaw. It is part of the Kansas City metropolitan area.

History
Kearney was unofficially founded in the spring of 1856 by David T. Duncan and W. R. Cave, and was originally called Centerville. Centerville was composed of what is now the southeastern portion of the town. In 1867, John Lawrence began laying out plans for another small settlement around the newly established Kansas City and Cameron Railroad subsidiary of the Hannibal and Saint Joseph Railroad which was to build the Hannibal Bridge establishing Kansas City, Missouri as the dominant city in the region. The president of the railroad was Charles E. Kearney (although there is speculation that it was named after Kearney, Nebraska). The railroad still operates as the  Burlington Northern and Santa Fe Railway. As they grew, the two settlements of Centerville and Kearney were effectively merged, and the town of Kearney, Missouri was officially incorporated in 1869.

The Claybrook House (since destroyed in a fire) and James Brothers' House and Farm are listed on the National Register of Historic Places.

Geography and climate 
Kearney is located in north central Clay County northeast of the Kansas City metropolitan area.

Climate 
Kearney lies in the humid continental climate zone, typical of the Midwestern United States. It experiences cold, snowy winters, and warm to hot, humid summers. The city lies in Tornado Alley, a region of the United States that is extremely prone to tornadoes and severe thunderstorms. Generally, most of this severe weather activity occurs in the spring and summer, although severe weather can and has occurred even in the winter months.

Demographics

2010 census
As of the census of 2010, there were 8,381 people, 2,978 households, and 2,270 families living in the city. The racial makeup of the city was 96.2% White, 0.4% African American, 0.4% Native American, 0.4% Asian, 0.1% Pacific Islander, 0.8% from other races, and 1.8% from two or more races. Hispanic or Latino of any race were 3.3% of the population.

There were 2,978 households, of which 47.0% had children under the age of 18 living with them, 60.3% were married couples living together, 11.6% had a female householder with no husband present, 4.3% had a male householder with no wife present, and 23.8% were non-families. 19.2% of all households were made up of individuals, and 8.9% had someone living alone who was 65 years of age or older. The average household size was 2.81 and the average family size was 3.23.

The median age in the city was 33.2 years. 32% of residents were under the age of 18; 6.8% were between the ages of 18 and 24; 30.6% were from 25 to 44; 21.4% were from 45 to 64; and 9.1% were 65 years of age or older. The gender makeup of the city was 48.1% male and 51.9% female.

2000 census
As of the census of 2000, there were 5,472 people, 1,910 households, and 1,495 families living in the city. The population density was 833.2 people per square mile (321.6/km2). There were 1,995 housing units at an average density of 303.8 per square mile (117.2/km2). The racial makeup of the city was 98.3% White, 0.90% African American, 0.4% Native American, 0.2% Asian, 0.55% from other races, and 1.15% from two or more races. Hispanic or Latino of any race were 1.9% of the population.

There were 1,910 households, out of which 49.2% had children under the age of 18 living with them, 63.9% were married couples living together, 10.9% had a female householder with no husband present, and 21.7% were non-families. 18.5% of all households were made up of individuals, and 7.8% had someone living alone who was 65 years of age or older. The average household size was 2.84 and the average family size was 3.24.

In the city the population was spread out, with 33.6% under the age of 18, 6.4% from 18 to 24, 35.4% from 25 to 44, 16.3% from 45 to 64, and 8.4% who were 65 years of age or older. The median age was 31 years. For every 100 females, there were 93.7 males. For every 100 females age 18 and over, there were 89.7 males.

The median income for a household in the city was $56,603, and the median income for a family was $64,540. Males had a median income of $45,721 versus $26,739 for females. The per capita income for the city was $21,147. About 1.8% of families and 2.5% of the population were below the poverty line, including 2.3% of those under age 18 and 5.8% of those age 65 or over.

Education
Kearney R-I School District operates an early childhood center, four elementary schools, one middle school, one junior high, and Kearney High School.

Kearney has a public library, a branch of the Mid-Continent Public Library.

Notable person

On September 5, 1847, Jesse James was born on the James farm, where his family resided to the northeast of the site on which Kearney would eventually be established. James formed the infamous James-Younger gang in 1866, which operated until the Younger brothers were captured in 1876. James formed a new gang in 1879 and continued until his death on April 3, 1882, when he was shot by fellow gang-member Robert Ford. He was buried on his farm, but now rests in Mt. Olivet Cemetery in Kearney.

References

External links
 Official website of City of Kearney
 Information on the Jesse James Festival and History of Kearney
 Official website of the Kearney Amphitheater
 Kearney School District
 Historic maps of Kearney in the Sanborn Maps of Missouri Collection at the University of Missouri

Cities in Clay County, Missouri
Populated places established in 1856
Cities in Missouri